Franz Schuh may refer to:
 Franz Schuh (writer) (born 1947), Austrian novelist, literary critic and essayist
 Franz Schuh (physician) (1804–1865), Austrian pathologist and surgeon
 Franz Schuh (swimmer) (1891–?), Austrian swimmer

See also 
 Schuh (disambiguation)